Baie de La Forêt is a small bay on the south coast of Brittany, France. The bay is located between Beg Meil (Fouesnant) and Cabellou (Concarneau).

Gallery

See also
 Concarneau
 La Forêt-Fouesnant
 Fouesnant

References 

Bays of Metropolitan France
Landforms of Finistère
Landforms of Brittany
Concarneau